The 2011 FIRS Men's Roller Hockey World Cup was the 40th edition of the FIRS Roller Hockey World Cup. It was held in September 2011 in San Juan, Argentina.
This was the fifth FIRS Roller Hockey World Cup organized in the province of San Juan.

It was initially announced that the tournament was to be held in Maputo, Mozambique and the city of San Juan, Argentina was designated the alternative host city. In July, 2010 the FIRS declared that San Juan, Argentina would take the place of Maputo as host city for the tournament.

Qualification

One year before the World Cup, the B World Championship was disputed in Dornbirn, Austria, where three teams were qualified.

The other thirteen qualified National Teams are the top thirteen National Teams of the previous World Cup, played in Vigo, Spain.

Venue

Matches
All times are Argentina Time (UTC-3).

Group stage

Group A

Group B

Group C

Group D

Knockout stage

Championship

5th–8th playoff

9th–16th playoff

13th–16th playoff

Final standing

References

External links
San Juan 2011 Official website

Roller Hockey World Cup
Rink Hockey World Championship
International roller hockey competitions hosted by Argentina
2011 World Championship
IRS Men's Roller Hockey World Cup